Catalina Pérez may refer to:

 Catalina Pérez (footballer, born 1994), Colombian soccer player who plays as a goalkeeper
 Catalina Pérez (footballer, born 1989), Argentine footballer who plays as a defender
Catalina Pérez Salinas, Chilean politician